BTS Group AB (BTS) is a global strategy implementation consulting firm founded in 1986. The company provides strategy alignment and execution consulting services and designs customized business simulations, digital technology, and assessments to develop business acumen, leadership, and sales capabilities.

BTS has several practice areas: Strategy Execution, Business Acumen, Leadership Development, Sales Training, Innovation, Coaching and Assessments. The company serves banking, biotech and pharmaceutical, consumer products, insurance, manufacturing, oil and gas, professional services, retail, technology, and telecommunications sectors.

Headquartered in Stockholm, Sweden, the firm has over 600 employees across 34 global offices. The company's client base is spread across 53 countries and includes 60 of the U.S. Fortune 100 and over 30 of the Global Fortune 100. BTS customers include companies such as Accenture, Aetna, Unilever, AT&T, Chevron, Coca-Cola, Ericsson, Google, GSK, Telstra, HSBC, Hewlett-Packard, Mondelez, Salesforce, Sodexo, Toyota, and others.

BTS is a public company listed on the NASDAQ-OMX Stockholm trading under the symbol BTS B.

In 2021 this company entered the Top 20 Assessment and Evaluation Company by Training Industry.

Organizational History 
BTS was founded in 1986 by Henrik Ekelund, current President and Chief Executive Officer, with the support of three investors from one of Scandinavia’s prominent strategic consulting firms. The firm focused on supporting clients’ efforts to implement strategy by focusing on the human capital part of the execution equation. The initials originally stood for Business Training Systems.  

In February 2005, BTS acquired Strategic Management Group, Inc. (SMG). The acquisition enabled the firm to create a broader base for future organic growth and deepen its expertise. In September 2006, BTS acquired The Real Learning Company (RLC) and Advantage Performance Group, Inc. (APG). The acquisitions consolidated a highly fragmented market and expanded the company's existing sales and leadership programs. 

In July 2013, BTS acquired Wizer A/S to expand the firm's digital capabilities and complement its existing portfolio. 

In October 2014, BTS acquired Fenestra Inc., a global provider of premier technology-enhanced assessment and leadership development centers and solutions. 

In March 2015, BTS acquired AVO Vision, a South African-based company focused on corporate learning and development as well as community-worksite education. The acquisition expanded the firm's global reach and expertise in the leadership development sphere as AVO Vision's core offerings focused on leadership, management, self-mastery, and sales execution skills. 

In 2016, BTS Group acquired Cesim Italia Srl and Design Innovation Srl based in Milan, Italy to strengthen its Southern European position.

In September 2015, BTS launched a new brand, logo, tagline ("Strategy made personal") and website, designed in partnership with UK-based Saffron Brand Consultants.

Services 
BTS supports executive management in the areas of strategy transformation, business and financial decision-making, key performance indicator alignment, merger integration, cross business-unit collaboration, innovation and customer understanding and relations. Client engagement teams typically consist of a combination of industry experts, capability specialists and professionals with local market knowledge. The company helps organizations in the implementation of change and the improvement of profitability through the following practice areas:
 Strategy Execution
 Business Acumen
 Leadership Development
 Sales Force Transformation
 Coaching
Assessment Centers
Innovation

Global Structure 
 North America: New York City, New York; Stamford, Connecticut; Chicago, Illinois; Austin, Texas; Scottsdale, Arizona; Los Angeles, California; San Francisco, California; Toronto, Canada  
 Europe: Helsinki, Finland; Stockholm, Sweden; Munich, Germany; Amsterdam, Netherlands; Brussels, Belgium; Paris, France; London, England; Bilbao, Spain, Madrid, Spain; Milan, Italy
 Middle East: Dubai, United Arab Emirates
 Asia: Bangalore, India; Mumbai, India; Bangkok, Thailand; Shanghai, China; Seoul, South Korea; Singapore; Taipei, Taiwan; Tokyo, Japan
 Central and South America: Mexico City, Mexico; Sao Paulo, Brazil
 Australia: Sydney, Melbourne
 Africa: Johannesburg, South Africa

Awards, honors and publications 
In 2017, BTS was named a Top 20 Leadership Training Company by Training Industry. The media publication also recognized BTS in 2016 as a Leadership Training Company to Watch and a Top 20 Sales Training Company. In 2015, Training Industry listed BTS as one of the top 20 Sales Training Organizations.  In 2014, BTS was named a Top 20 Sales Training Organizations and one of the Top 20 Gamification Companies. In 2013, BTS was acknowledged by Training Industry as one of the top 20 Leadership Development companies for the second year in a row.

In 2016, BTS received two Brandon Hall Awards for client partnerships - a Gold with Intuit for the Best Unique or Innovative Leadership Development Program, and a Silver with MetLife for the Best Advance in Assessment Utilization to Guide Talent Decisions Category. BTS received a Silver 2013 Brandon Hall Group Excellence in Learning Award for their partnership with AT&T to create the AT&T Sales and Service Center Simulation. BTS client Newell Rubbermaid was awarded Sales Training Program of the Year by Stevie Awards for their customized solution.

BTS Asia Pacific received a 2016 HR Vendors of the Year Award, hosted by Human Resources Magazine, in the Best Leadership Development Consultant Category.

Sponsorship
Since 2010, BTS USA has partnered with Rainforest Trust on sustainability campaigns to preserve threatened rainforests. In 2015, BTS sponsored the second round of the Rainforest Trust #SkiptoSave campaign supporting Rainforest Trust's 2020 Initiative designed to protect 20 million acres of rainforest by 2020.

In partnership with the Sparkassesntiftung fur international Kooperation (Savings Banks Foundation for International Cooperation), BTS has created a business simulation program to teach business and financial acumen in developing nations. As of June 2015, such programs had been held for more than 10,000 participants in 12 countries.

Management

References

External links 

Wall Street Journal Article
Reuters Page

International management consulting firms
Strategy consulting firms of the United States
Leadership
Experiential learning
Business simulation games
1986 establishments in Connecticut
Consulting firms established in 1986
Companies based in Stamford, Connecticut
Companies listed on Nasdaq Stockholm